Serine/threonine-protein kinase VRK2 is an enzyme that in humans is encoded by the VRK2 gene.

This gene encodes a member of the vaccinia-related kinase (VRK) family of serine/threonine protein kinases. This gene is widely expressed in human tissues and has increased expression in actively dividing cells, such as those in testis, leukocytes, fetal liver, and carcinomas. Its protein localizes to the endoplasmic reticulum and has been shown to phosphorylate casein and undergo autophosphorylation.

While several transcript variants may exist for this gene, the full-length nature of only one has been biologically validated to date.

References

Further reading